Marko Hübenbecker (also spelled Huebenbecker, born 14 June 1986) is a German bobsledder who has competed since 2008.

References

External links
 
 
 
 
 

1986 births
Living people
German male bobsledders
Bobsledders at the 2014 Winter Olympics
Olympic bobsledders of Germany
Sportspeople from Erfurt